Volga Volga is a 1928 German silent drama film directed by Viktor Tourjansky and starring Hans Adalbert Schlettow, Lillian Hall-Davis, and Boris de Fast. It was one of several Russian-themed films that exiled  producer Joseph N. Ermolieff made in Munich during the 1920s. Interiors were shot at the Staaken Studios in Berlin and on location in Wolin . The film's sets were designed by the art directors Andrej Andrejew, Max Heilbronner and Erich Zander.  It was distributed in the United States by Kinematrade Inc. in 1933 with dubbed English narration and dialogue, written by Alexander Bakshy, added.

Cast

References

Bibliography

External links 
 

1928 films
1920s historical drama films
German historical drama films
Films of the Weimar Republic
German silent feature films
Films directed by Victor Tourjansky
Films set in Russia
Films set in the 1660s
Films set in the 1670s
German black-and-white films
1928 drama films
Silent drama films
1920s German films
Films shot at Staaken Studios